The fifth running of the women's event of the Three Days of Bruges–De Panne, also called Exterioo Classic Brugge–De Panne, was held on 24 March 2022. It is the fourth race of the 2022 UCI Women's World Tour. The race was won by Elisa Balsamo in a sprint.

Teams
Twelve UCI Women's WorldTeams (Team Jumbo Visma and EF Education–Tibco–SVB chose not to start this race) and eleven UCI Women's Continental Teams competed in the race. 

UCI Women's WorldTeams

 
 
 
 
 
 
 
 
 
 
 
 

UCI Women's Continental Teams

Results

References

External links
 

Classic Brugge–De Panne
Three Days of Bruges–De Panne
Classic Brugge–De Panne
Classic Brugge–De Panne (women's race)